Gilahli Mosque - is located in Shaki, Azerbaijan.

Architecture
This mosque is a bright example of how a domestic architecture influenced upon the architecture of quarterly mosques of Shaki, Ordubad and other cities of Azerbaijan during the 18th-19th centuries. This influence can be felt in the interpretation of architectural masses and forms and in details of the mosques’ ornamentation. A rectangle with internal dimensions of 6x12 and four wooden columns sustaining the ceiling cover is the main part of Gilahli mosque. Walls of the mosque are made of sun-dried bricks and cobble-stones. External parts of the walls were plastered and internal parts were decorated with colorful ornaments. This colorful interior of a prayer hall is the great significance of the monument.     

Research of mosques in different cities of Azerbaijan showed that the mosques constructed in the 18th-19th centuries have analogical solution both in architectural-planning structure and construction methods. Calligraphically used frieze inscriptions and also geometric and plant ornaments were the main ornamentation motifs of the quarterly mosques. Walls of the praying hall are plastered and plant and geometric ornaments colored with various bright colors are carved on them. Margin of mihrab and curb with the frieze inscription also attracts attention.

See also
 List of mosques in Azerbaijan

References

External links
Tarixi abidələrin bərpasına dəstək
“Aşağı Karvansara” ilkin simasına qayıdır

Monuments and memorials in Azerbaijan
Mosques in Shaki